Revolutionary Organization 17 November (Epanastatiki Organosi dekaefta Noemvri), also known as 17N or the 17 November Group, was a Greek Marxist–Leninist urban guerrilla organization. formed in 1975 and led by Alexandros Giotopoulos. 17N conducted an extensive urban guerrilla campaign against the Greek state, banks, and businesses. The organization committed 103 known armed robberies, assassinations, and bombing attacks, during which 23 people were killed.

Attacks

17N's first attack, on 23 December 1975, was against the U.S. Central Intelligence Agency's station chief in Athens, Richard Welch. Welch was gunned down outside his residence by three assailants, in front of his wife and driver. 17N's repeated claims of responsibility were ignored until 25 December 1976, when it murdered the former Intelligence Chief of the Greek security police, convicted of torturing political prisoners, Evangelos Mallios, and left "scattered leaflets" at the scene claiming responsibility for the 1975 Welch murder.

17N used two M1911 pistols as its "signature weapons".

After their inaugural attack on the CIA station chief, the group tried to get mainstream newspapers to publish their manifesto. Their first proclamation, claiming the murder of Richard Welch, was first sent to "Libération" in Paris, France.  It was given to the publisher of "Libération" via the offices of Jean-Paul Sartre.

Police suspected the group of using a stolen anti-armor rocket to attack a downtown branch of the American Citibank in April 1998. The attack caused damage but no injuries, as the warhead did not explode. The rocket was fired by remote control from a private car parked outside the bank on Drossopoulou street in the downtown district of Kypseli.

A British defence attache Brigadier Stephen Saunders was shot and killed on 8 June 2000 by two men on motorbikes as he drove to work in Kifissia, Athens.

Victims

17N's known murdered (23) and injured victims include:

Trial

The trial of 19 individuals suspected of involvement with 17N commenced in Athens on 3 March 2003, with Christos Lambrou serving as the lead prosecutor for the Greek state. Because of the 20-year statute of limitations, crimes committed before 1984 (such as the killing of the CIA station chief) could not be tried by the court. On 8 December, fifteen of the accused, including Giotopoulos and Koufontinas, were found guilty; another four defendants were acquitted for lack of evidence. The convicted members were sentenced on 17 December 2003. All those convicted defendants appealed. On 3 May 2007, the convictions were upheld.

Prison 
In early January 2014, Christodoulos Xyros, one of the imprisoned leaders of the organization, escaped from prison. On 6 January, he failed to report to the police after leaving prison under the condition to report to the police every day, which he did six times in 18 months. He was taken into custody while riding a bicycle in the southern suburb of Anavyssos in early January 2015.

In 2018 the group's alleged hitman Dimitris Koufontinas was moved from Korydallos Prison to a low security agricultural facility after the prison council approved his parole request, citing exemplary behaviour.

2021 hunger strike 
On 8 January 2021, at 63 years of age, Koufontinas entered a hunger strike with the demand of transfer to Korydallos Prison after being sent to a high security prison in Domokos. On 22 February whilst in intensive care at Lamia Hospital Koufontinas started to reject water and medical care, forcibly removing a catheter from his arm before the courts issued an order to force feed the prisoner a few days later, a practice condemned by many, including a Greek union of doctors as torture. It was reported that on 5 March, Koufontinas had to be resuscitated due to kidney failure. Koufontinas ended his hunger strike on 14 March after 65 days despite his demands not being met.

Street demonstrations were held in multiple cities across Greece as well as attacks against property has been claimed in support of Koufontinas, including a demonstration outside of president Katerina Sakellaropoulou's home and vandalism of buildings belonging to Action 24 TV station and the office of Education Minister Niki Kerameus with paint and projectiles by multiple groups of protesters. Many in the public sphere have shown support for Koufontinas including Miguel Urbán, a co-founder of Podemos and film-maker Costa-Gavras.

Conspiracy theories 
Some Greek officials considered Revolutionary Struggle (EA), the group that fired a Chinese-made RPG-7 rocket-propelled grenade at the U.S. Embassy in Athens in January 2007, to be a spin-off of 17N. However, three self-admitted EA members arrested in April 2010 claimed that they were anarchists—a designation 17N rejected in its proclamations. For many years, leading politicians of the right-wing New Democracy party, as well as the conservative press, falsely claimed that Prime Minister Andreas Papandreou was the mastermind behind 17N. Virginia Tsouderou, who became Deputy Foreign Minister in the Mitsotakis government, and journalist Giorgos Karatzaferis (later the founder and leader of a right-wing party, LAOS) claimed that terrorism in Greece was controlled by Papandreist officers of Hellenic National Intelligence Service (the Greek security and intelligence service), and named Kostas Tsimas (the head of EYP) and Colonel Alexakis as two of the supposed controllers of 17N. However, after 17N members were arrested, the only connection between the terrorist organization and PASOK was the fact that Dimitris Koufontinas was a member of PAMK (Panellinia Agonistiki Mathitiki Kinisi, Panhellenic Militant Pupil's Movement). the PASOK militant high school students organization) and an admirer of Andreas Papandreou in his late teens.

Other writers have also claimed that 17N may have been a tool of foreign secret services. In December 2005, Kleanthis Grivas published an article in To Proto Thema, a Greek Sunday newspaper, in which he accused "Sheepskin", the Greek branch of Gladio, NATO's stay-behind paramilitary organization during the Cold War, of the 1975 assassination of Welch, as well as of the 2000 assassination of Saunders. This was denied by the US State Department, which responded that "the Greek terrorist organization '17 November' was responsible for both assassinations", and asserted that Grivas' central piece of evidence had been the "Westmoreland Field Manual," which the State Department, as well as a Congressional inquiry, had dismissed as a Soviet forgery. The State Department also highlighted the fact that, in the case of Richard Welch, "Grivas bizarrely accuses the CIA of playing a role in the assassination of one of its own senior officials" as well as the Greek government's statements to the effect that the "stay behind" network had been dismantled in 1988.

See also
Terrorism in Greece
Revolutionary Struggle
Conspiracy of Fire Nuclei
Greece–United Kingdom relations

References

Bibliography

Further reading
 Constantine Buhayer, "The UK's Role in Boosting Greek Counter Terrorism Capabilities," Jane's Intelligence Review, 1 September 2002.
 
 

Far-left politics
Far-left politics in Greece
Organizations established in 1975
Communist organizations in Greece
Terrorism in Greece
Organisations designated as terrorist by the United Kingdom
Organizations designated as terrorist by the United States
1975 establishments in Greece
History of Greece since 1974
Communist terrorism
Left-wing militant groups in Greece
Anti-Americanism